Philippe-Ernest Legrand (2 September 1866 – 1 July 1953) was a French Hellenist. An historian, philologist, archaeologist, epigrapher, his great work was the translation and editing of Histories (Herodotus), published in the Collection Budé, which is still a reference.

Career 
Philippe-Ernest Legrand studied at the École Normale Supérieure from 1885 to 1888 and received a doctorate of Letters in 1898; One of his thesis was on Theocritus, and his complementary thesis was entitled .

He taught at the University of Lyon from 1891 until 1926. In 1902, he obtained the chair of Greek philology and epigraphy, and then, from 1920, that of Greek language and literature. He took early retirement in 1926, and settled in the Château de Culan to work on his edition of Herodotus.

He was also a member of the French School at Athens between 1888 and 1891 and a member of the Académie des Inscriptions et Belles-Lettres from 1933.

Work 
Besides Herodotus, he studied the work of many Greek poets, including the Bucolics. A specialist of literary history, he was also strongly interested in Menander, who was rediscovered at the beginning of the century thanks to the Oxyrhynchus Papyri as well as in new comedy. An incomplete list of authors on which he worked includes Sophron, Callimachus, Herondas, Leonidas of Tarentum, the pseudo-Theocritus, Bion of Phlossa, Moschos, and John Chrysostom.

Bibliography

Editions and monographies 

1898: Étude sur Théocrite, "Bibliothèque des Écoles françaises d'Athènes et de Rome", fasc. LXXIX
1910: Daos : Tableau de la Comédie grecque pendant la période dite nouvelle, Lyon, Fontemoing
1924: La Poésie alexandrine, Payot
1925–1927:  Les Bucoliques grecs, Paris, Les Belles Lettres, Collection des Universités de France, 2 vol.
1925: Théocrite
1927: Pseudo-Théocrite, Moschos, Bion, divers
1932–1954: Édition et traduction de Hérodote, Histoires, Paris, Les Belles Lettres, Collection des Universités de France, 10 vol.
1932: Introduction
1932: Livre I: Clio
1936: Livre II: Euterpe
1939: Livre III: Thalie
1945: Livre IV: Melpomène
1946: Livre V: Terpsichore
1948: Livre VI: Erato
1951: Livre VII: Polymnie
1953: Livre VIII: Uranie
1954: Livre IX: Calliope
1966: Index analytique

Articles 

References

External links 
 Obituary on Persée

École Normale Supérieure alumni
19th-century French historians
20th-century French historians
French hellenists
Literary historians
Members of the Académie des Inscriptions et Belles-Lettres
Members of the French School at Athens
People from Cher (department)
1866 births
1953 deaths
Corresponding Fellows of the British Academy